Twelve Forever is an American animated streaming series created by Julia Vickerman, a former writer and storyboard artist known for her work on Clarence, Rick and Morty, Harvey Girls Forever!, Paradise P.D. and The Powerpuff Girls. Twelve Forever premiered in the United States on Netflix on July 29, 2019.

Premise
The series is set in the early 2000s and centers on Regina "Reggie" Abbott (Kelsy Abbott), an imaginative 12-year-old whose desire to remain a child is so powerful she can enter another world in which she never has to grow up: an island called Endless where her childhood toys and drawings are real. She is joined by her friends Todd (Antony Del Rio) and Esther Hopkins (Jaylen Barron), who visit this amazing world to live out their superhero fantasies and escape the responsibilities of impending adulthood. Life and reality often catch up with them in Endless as the preteens start dealing with growing pains and conflicts develop between them. The negativity the friends experience while dealing with their new complicated problems feed their enemy, the nefarious Butt Witch (Matt Berry), who seeks to destroy Endless.

Voice cast
 Kelsy Abbott as Reggie, Wade, Kathy, Flaps, Flowery Woman, Billy Canyon, Tammy, Dr. Tenders, Swimple Jan, Plates, Mike, Omelet, Winged Moyse
 Antony Del Rio as Todd, Chairold, Garrett, Sherbert
 Jaylen Barron as Esther, Pretty Please, Tater Tot, Gorbis, Darla, Tori
 Matt Berry as The Butt Witch
 Steve Agee as Big Deal, Mack, Beefhouse, Galaxander, Hunk, Monster Brown Roger
 Wade Randolph as Borbo, Dr. Champion, Mr. Christopherson, Label Maker Monster, Lump, Uncle Paul, AJ, Bobby
 Laura Zak as Mrs. Krandle, Tanopy, Explorer Sally, Pancake, Rooty, Lorbis, Queen Limerick
 Bridget Everett as Judy
 Spencer Rothbell as Colin, Swimple Dan, Tasty Troy, Pitui-Terry, Squad Bro, Rance, Big Ol' Gordon, Jacques Board, Shaun
 Nick Sumida as Bags of Marbles, Beth, Chewing Gum Stanley, Garrett, Señor Corduroy
 Brandon Wardell as Dustin
 Daniel Amerman as Aaron
 Sam Brown as Manny, Schmaaron
 Noel Fielding as Guy Pleasant
 Kate Freund as Donna
 John Eric Bentley as Mr. Kapusinski
 Ron Funches as Manguin
 Brittany Ashley as Kendra, Leslie
 Amy Sedaris as Sadmantha
 Maximus Riegel as Ogden
 Stephanie Beatriz as Conelly
 Chris Fleming as Mr. Fleming
 Ashley Boettcher as Gwen
 Curt Neill as Rodney
 Paul Williams as Captain Elmer
 Reese Hartwig as Shane (Pilot only) 
 Jorge Diaz as Tristan (Pilot only)

Production
The original pilot was produced for Cartoon Network, by Cartoon Network Studios, and was originally released on their website on May 18, 2015. In December 2017, it was announced that Netflix had acquired the rights to Twelve Forever for a full series, with production duties being handled by The Cartel and Puny Entertainment. Shadi Petosky began working on the show sometime before July 2017, when she hoped for more episodes of Danger & Eggs, as a non-creative/non-writing executive producer.

LGBTQ representation

One of the executive producers of the series, Petosky, described Reggie as a queer character "coming to terms with her sexuality". The series also features a number of other LGBTQ characters: Mack and Beefhouse, a gay couple in the fantasy world of Endless Island, and Galaxander, who previously had a boyfriend. As for Reggie, she has a crush on Conelly, a 13-year-old schoolmate with whom she shares the same taste in imagining and creating stories, as shown in the two-part episode "Locked Out Forever". Due to the show's abrupt ending, Petosky stated they won't be able to further explore that aspect of the character/relationship.

As such, GLAAD recognized the series as one of a number of shows released in 2019 with LGBTQ representation.

Episodes

Cartoon Network pilot (2015)

Season 1 (2019)

Reception
Reviews of the series have been mostly positive. Lacey Womack of ScreenRant said the series was something those of all ages could enjoy. Rodney Ho of The Atlanta Journal-Constitution said that there was a "great pedigree" of those working on the show. Kevin Johnson of The A.V. Club said the show had a "sense of its Midwest, small town setting as the backdrop of conformist pressure" and compared it to Gravity Falls. Dina Rudolph of the Windy City Times praised its LGBTQ representation, putting it alongside shows such as Steven Universe, She-Ra and the Princesses of Power, Kipo and the Age of Wonderbeasts, The Dragon Prince, and OK K.O.! Let's Be Heroes. The Encyclopedia of Science Fiction contributor Steven Pearce argued that the show juggles dark and light, the real world and the imagined world, with Endless acting out "metaphorical versions of Reggie's real-world problems." Pearce also said that the series is good and inventive, bringing in surrealism, "pre-teen angst, humour and twelve-year-olds using flame-throwers." Mandie Carroll of Common Sense Media described the series as a "wonderfully weird show" with heart and to expect cartoon violence. She also said that young teenagers and tweens would enjoy the show's "imaginative world, relatable yet quirky characters, and the raw emotionality of this colorful cartoon."

In January 2020, GLAAD nominated the show for its Outstanding Kids & Family Programming award, along with a host of other shows.

Cancellation
In September 2019, Shadi Petosky announced that the show had been cancelled in a now-deleted tweet. While Petosky was described as the executive producer on the show in a July 2019 AP article on LGBTQ representation in animation, she stated in September 2019 that she had no connection with the show since the show's first season had premiered on Netflix earlier that year. It was also stated, in September 2019, that the producers of the show had parted way with the series creator, Julia Vickerman.

In 2020, Lacey Womack of Screen Rant stated the show was "on an indefinite hiatus," with uncertain plans for the future.

References

External links

Twelve Forever on Netflix

Twelve Forever Official Website and Store

2010s American animated television series
2019 American television series debuts
2019 American television series endings
American children's animated action television series
American children's animated adventure television series
American children's animated comedy television series
American children's animated fantasy television series
English-language Netflix original programming
Netflix children's programming
Animated television series by Netflix
2010s American surreal comedy television series
Television series set in the 2000s
Television shows set in Iowa
Middle school television series
Animated television series about children
2010s American LGBT-related animated television series
LGBT speculative fiction television series